André Couvrette (January 15, 1934 - December 31, 2020) was a Canadian diplomat. 

André Couvrette was the Ambassador Extraordinary and Plenipotentiary to Guinea, Mali, Mauritania, Senegal, Guinea-Bissau, Cape Verde, Syria, Jordan, Lebanon, Sweden,  and Greece. Before his first ambassadorship, he was posted to Rome, Italy (1959–1962), Lagos, Nigeria (1965–1967), and Paris, France (1967–1968). In his home country, he was Chief of Protocol and Assistant Under Secretary of State for External Affairs.

He was also High Commissioner to The Gambia.

He was the son of businessman and former mayor of Outremont Bernard Couvrette and Myrielle Chartrand and brother Lucie, Yves, and Jean-Jacques. He married Micheline Couvrette in 1958 and had three sons and one daughter. 

He passed at the age of 86 on December 31, 2020, surrounded by his children.

External links 

 Foreign Affairs and International Trade Canada Complete List of Posts
 Couvrette has written online memoirs available in French at http://plusdetranger.blogspot.com/ and at blurb.ca

1934 births
2020 deaths
French Quebecers
Ambassadors of Canada to Syria
Ambassadors of Canada to Guinea
Ambassadors of Canada to Mali
Ambassadors of Canada to Mauritania
Ambassadors of Canada to Senegal
High Commissioners of Canada to the Gambia
Ambassadors of Canada to Guinea-Bissau
Ambassadors of Canada to Cape Verde
Ambassadors of Canada to Jordan
Ambassadors of Canada to Lebanon
Ambassadors of Canada to Sweden
Ambassadors of Canada to Greece
People from Outremont, Quebec